Aspect Television is an independent television production company established in 1999 and based in Cardiff, Wales which specialises in factual programmes and corporate productions.

Programmes

People 
 Jamie Owen — co-founder and presenter
 Rob Finighan — co-founder, director and producer
 Adrian Chiles — presenter

References

External links
 Official Web Site

Television production companies of the United Kingdom